Asavbashevo (Aśawbaş; , Asavpuś) is a rural locality (a village) in Semyonkinsky Selsoviet, Aurgazinsky District, Bashkortostan, Russia. The population was 414 as of 2010. There are 4 streets.

Geography 
Asavbashevo is located 26 km southwest of Tolbazy (the district's administrative centre) by road. Semyonkino is the nearest rural locality.

References 

Rural localities in Aurgazinsky District